Rebecca Perkins Kwoka (born September 1982) is an American politician who has served in the New Hampshire Senate from the 21st district since 2020. Her district encompasses Portsmouth, Durham, Newmarket, Lee, Newfields, Madbury, and Newington.

She is the first openly LGBTQ+ woman elected to the New Hampshire Senate. She resides in Portsmouth with her wife and daughters.

References 

New Hampshire Democrats
Dartmouth College alumni
Cornell Law School alumni
People from Portsmouth, New Hampshire
Living people
1982 births